Diderik Hegermann (6 December 1763 – 7 February 1835)  was a military officer and government minister of Norway. He served as a member of the Norwegian Constituent Assembly in 1814.

Biography
Diderik Hegermann was born at Altona in Schleswig-Holstein. In accordance with family tradition, he chose a military career. He became a cadet in 1776 and served  as a Sergeant until 1786. He became a Lieutenant in 1786 in the Corps of Cadets in Copenhagen. In 1790, he was appointed Captain.  In 1800, he was  promoted to Major and appointed commander on the War School in Christiania (now Oslo). In 1808, he became Lieutenant Colonel and from 1812 he was commander of Oppland  Infantry Regiment. Hegermann served as Colonel during the Swedish–Norwegian War (1814).  He led the defense at the Battle of Langnes.
 
Diderik Hegermann represented the Oppland infantry Regiment (Oplandske Infanterie Regement) at the Norwegian Constitutional Assembly  at Eidsvold in 1814. He was a member of the Constitutional Committee and supported the independence party (Selvstendighetspartiet). He served on the Norwegian Councilor of State of the 6th Ministry (war administration) in 1814 and 1814–1815 and Minister of the Army 1815–1816. In 1817, he was granted a discharge from government service. 

He was married in 1815 to Hanne Christine Susanne Nideros (1779-1858), widow of Daniel Isaachsen Willoch who had died in 1813. Following his retirement,  he entered the lumber business, operating sawmills and a shipyard at Tveit in Vest-Agder .

Honors
Hegermann was decorated as a Knight of the Order of the Dannebrog.

References

External links
Representantene på Eidsvoll 1814 (Cappelen Damm AS)
 Men of Eidsvoll (eidsvollsmenn)

Related reading
Holme Jørn (2014) De kom fra alle kanter - Eidsvollsmennene og deres hus  (Oslo: Cappelen Damm) 

1763 births
1835 deaths
People from the Province of Schleswig-Holstein
Norwegian military personnel of the Napoleonic Wars
Norwegian Army generals
Presidents of the Storting
Fathers of the Constitution of Norway
Knights of the Order of the Dannebrog
People from Altona, Hamburg
Defence ministers of Norway